Baliosus nervosus, the basswood leaf miner, is a species of leaf beetle in the family Chrysomelidae. It is found in North America. It's typical host is basswood, and adults skeletonize the surface of leaves. Larvae have been known to create leaf mines on soybean leaves.

References

Further reading

External links

 

Cassidinae
Articles created by Qbugbot
Beetles described in 1794